Dinuk Wikramanayaka (born 15 May 1994) is a Sri Lankan cricketer. He made his first-class debut for Panadura Sports Club in the 2013–14 Premier Trophy on 17 January 2014.

References

External links
 

1994 births
Living people
Sri Lankan cricketers
Jaffna District cricketers
Panadura Sports Club cricketers
Tamil Union Cricket and Athletic Club cricketers
Sportspeople from Kandy